Young Artists for Haiti was a movement to engage Canada's young musicians to continue to inspire an ongoing effort and contribution to Canadian charities for their work to help the people of Haiti overcome the devastation from the  7.1 magnitude earthquake that rocked the country on January 12, 2010. More than 50 Canadian artists gathered at The Warehouse Studio in Vancouver, British Columbia to record a rendition of renowned hip hop artist K'naan's "Wavin' Flag".

Produced by Canadian producer, Bob Ezrin, co-produced by Garth Richardson and Shawn Marino, and engineered by Mike Fraser, the song was reworked to include specific lyrics for Haiti and was released on March 12, 2010, raising over $1 million with proceeds going to Free The Children, War Child Canada and World Vision Canada. Ezrin stated, "With the wealth of young artists coming out of Canada, it was obvious that this is something we had to do. K'naan's lyrics in Wavin' Flag embody the pain, passion and determination of the Haitian people and lend the hope of a brighter future. The response from the artists has been sensational, and I am so proud that together we may help to make a difference."

Background 
While in Vancouver for the 2010 Winter Olympics opening ceremony, Bob Ezrin along with fellow music industry leaders, including Randy Lennox and Gary Slaight, recognized the moneymaking potential of mobilizing some of Canada's young musicians in an ongoing effort to help the people of Haiti. Within a short week, the collaboration of Young Artists for Haiti was formed. The song was recorded at The Warehouse Studio in Vancouver, which is owned by Bryan Adams, and edited at the Nimbus School of Recording Arts.

Release of single Wavin' Flag and chart performance

The song was released March 12, 2010 with all proceeds going to designated charities: World Vision, Free The Children and War Child.

"Wavin' Flag" debuted at number one on the Canadian Hot 100 on the issue dated March 27, 2010. It is the third song in the chart's history to debut at number one, after Eminem's "Crack a Bottle" and Taylor Swift's "Today Was a Fairytale" did so in February 2009 and February 2010, respectively.

Artists 
This is the full list of performers featured on the track.

Soloists (in order of appearance)

K'naan
Nelly Furtado
Sam Roberts
Avril Lavigne
Pierre Bouvier 
Tyler Connolly 
Kardinal Offishall
Jully Black
Lights
Deryck Whibley 
Serena Ryder
Jacob Hoggard 

Emily Haines 
Hawksley Workman
Drake
Chin Injeti
Pierre Lapointe, Elisapie Isaac, Ima
Esthero, Corb Lund, Bob Ezrin
Fefe Dobson
Nikki Yanofsky
Matt Mays
Justin Nozuka
Justin Bieber

Chorus

Arkells
Lamar Ashe
Broken Social Scene
Torquil Campbell
Canadian Tenors
Aion Clarke
Dallas Green 
Tom Cochrane
Michael Bublé
Jim Cuddy 
Jim Creeggan 
Kathleen Edwards
Dave Faber 
Jessie Farrell
Colin James
Patrick Kordyback 

Brandon Lehti 
Colin MacDonald 
Jay Malinowski 
Stacey McKitrick
Suzie McNeil
Guillaume Francoeur
Stephan Moccio
Kevin Parent
Josh Ramsay 
Red 1
Hayley Sales
James Shaw 
Shiloh
Tim Baker

See also 
 List of artists who reached number one on the Canadian Hot 100
 List of Canadian Hot 100 number-one singles of 2010
 Tears Are Not Enough, a similar event in 1985 organized by Northern Lights (Canadian band)
 We Are the World, a similar event in 1985 organized by USA for Africa

References

External links 
 Young Artists for Haiti

2010 Haiti earthquake relief
Music organizations based in Canada
Canada–Haiti relations
Juno Award for Single of the Year winners
Charity supergroups